Oldfieldia is a plant genus under the family Picrodendraceae, the only member of its subtribe (Paiveusinae).  It was described as a genus in 1850.

Oldfieldia is endemic to Africa.

Species

Oldfieldia is after Richard Albert Kearns Oldfield (R.A.K Oldfield) the British plant collector in Nigeria and Sierra Leone and surgeon on the 1832-1834 Niger River expedition with Laird and Lauder 

 Oldfieldia africana Benth. & Hook.f. - 	Ivory Coast, Liberia, Sierra Leone, Gabon, Cameroon, Central African Republic, Congo Republic
 Oldfieldia dactylophylla (Welw. ex Oliv.) J.Léonard - Zaïre, Tanzania, Zambia, Angola
 Oldfieldia macrocarpa J.Léonard - Zaïre
 Oldfieldia somalensis (Chiov.) Milne-Redh - Somali, Kenya, Tanzania, Mozambique

References

Picrodendraceae
Flora of Africa
Malpighiales genera